Bright Lights is a 1916 American short comedy film directed by Roscoe Arbuckle and starring Arbuckle, Mabel Normand and Al St. John.

Plot summary

Cast
 Roscoe Arbuckle as Fatty
 Mabel Normand as Mabel
 Al St. John as The Bartender
 Joe Bordeaux as Man Used as Battering Ram by Fatty
 Jimmy Bryant as Minor Role
 Minta Durfee as Minor Role
 Gilbert Ely as Minor Role
 William Jefferson as The City Slicker

See also
 List of American films of 1916
 Fatty Arbuckle filmography

References

External links
 
 

1916 films
Films directed by Roscoe Arbuckle
American silent short films
American black-and-white films
1916 comedy films
1916 short films
Triangle Film Corporation films
Silent American comedy films
American comedy short films
1910s American films